Eleanor of Austria may refer to:
 Archduchesses of Austria by birth:
Eleanor of Austria (1498–1558), daughter of Philip the Handsome 
Eleanor of Austria, Duchess of Mantua (1534–1594), daughter of Emperor Ferdinand I 
Archduchess Eleanor (1582–1620), daughter of Archduke Charles II
Eleanor of Austria, Queen of Poland (1653–1697), daughter of Emperor Ferdinand III
Eleonore von Habsburg (born 1994), granddaughter of Otto, Crown Prince of Austria
 Archduchesses of Austria by marriage:
Eleanor of Scotland (1433–1480), wife of Sigismund, Archduke of Austria
Eleanor of Portugal, Holy Roman Empress (1434–1467), wife of Emperor Frederick III
Eleonor Gonzaga (1598–1655), wife of Emperor Ferdinand II
Eleanor Gonzaga (1630–1686), wife of Emperor Ferdinand III